WTMK (88.5 FM) is a radio station broadcasting a Christian contemporary music format. Licensed to Wanatah, Indiana, United States, the station is currently owned by Olivet Nazarene University. This station also broadcasts the Lowell Senior High School Red Devils football games as an affiliate of the Regional Radio Sports Network.

History
WTMK began broadcasting in 2005 and was originally licensed to Lowell, Indiana. It aired a Christian format was owned by CSN International. In 2008, CSN International sold WTMK, along with a number of other stations, to Calvary Radio Network, Inc. These stations were sold to Calvary Chapel Costa Mesa later that year. In 2010, Calvary Radio Network purchased WTMK back from Calvary Chapel Costa Mesa. The station was sold to Olivet Nazarene University later that year for $130,000, and began broadcasting the Christian contemporary music format known as Shine.fm. In 2015, the station was moved from Lowell, Indiana to Wanatah.

References

External links

Mass media in Lake County, Indiana
Radio stations established in 2005
2005 establishments in Indiana
TMK
Contemporary Christian radio stations in the United States